Elections for Coventry City Council were held on Thursday 3 May 2007. As the council is elected by thirds, one seat in each of the wards was up for election.

The Labour Party gained two seats (Foleshill and Wyken) from the Conservative Party one seat (St Michaels) from Socialist Alternative, and one seat (Upper Stoke) from the Liberal Democrats.

The Conservative party held overall control of the council.

Election result

Council Composition
The composition of the council before and after the election can be found in the following table:

Ward results

Heather Rutter was the former Conservative councillor for Sherbourne ward who stood as an independent after being deselected.  The result of Conservative hold is a comparison to when this seat was last contested.

Mick Noonan was the former Conservative councillor for Wyken ward who stood as an independent after being deselected.  The result of Conservative hold is a comparison to when this seat was last contested.

References
 

2007 English local elections
2007
2000s in Coventry